Church windows are windows in a church.

Church window can also refer to:

 Church window (dessert)
 Stained glass window, associated with churches
 Vetrate di Chiesa ('Church Windows'), a piece of music by Ottorino Respighi